Raza Obrera (English: Working Class) is a Regional Mexican band known for their unique style of music and its prominent use of the harp, along with the accordion and charango. They are based out of Newark, California, United States, and are originally from Aguililla, Michoacán, Mexico. Their style is a combination of rough  Pacific-style Norteño and Big Harp Conjunto from Michoacán. Another Regional Mexican band with a similar style is Los Canarios de Michoacán.

History
The band was started in 1996 by members José Luis Arroyo (drums, vocals), José Luis Horta (accordion, Vocals), Roberto González (charango), Simón Rivera (harp) and Rigoberto Peña (bass, vocals). The band signed with Ego Records in 1996 and released their debut album El Águila González and became involved in the U.S Regional Mexican scene. Raza Obrera is known for their corridos based on controversial issues relating to the Mexican working class.

Members
 José Luis Arroyo - director, lead vocals, drums
 José Luis Horta - lead vocals, accordion
 Barocio - harp
 Iván Oso Rea - bass
 Misa Reyes - bajo quinto
 Pedro Venegas - keyboard

Former members
 Rigoberto Peña - vocals, bass
 Simon Rivera - harp
 Roberto Gonzalez - charango
 Hugo Pedraza - keyboards
 Nelson Rivas - bass

Discography
 El Aguila Gonzalez(1996) 
 Corridazos Prohibidos(2001) 
 Arpacumbiando: Caliente, Caliente (2001) 
 El Dia de los Malandrines(2001)
 El Cocinero(2001)
 Arpacumbiando, Vol. 2(2002)
 Rolononas Pa'la Raza(2003)
 Ritmo, Amor, y Pueblo (2004)
 El Campirano: Puros Corridos(2004)
 14 Nuevas: Pa' Celebrar El 10° Aniversario con Nuestra Raza (2006) 
 Paniqueando y Parrandeando Con una Mera (2007)
 Atado A Ti(2010)
 Caminos de Michoacan(2013)

Billboard chart history
72- Arpacumbiando Vol. 2, Raza Obrera, August 17, 2002 
72- Linea De Oro: Caliente, Caliente Y Muchos Exitos Mas..., Raza Obrera, June 16, 2007

References

External links
 Official website
 Raza Obrera Billboard

Mexican music
Musical groups from Michoacán